Fiddle Lake is a lake located in Waterford Township, Michigan. It lies west of Highland Rd. (M-59) and north of Elizabeth Lake Rd. 
The 9-acre lake connects with Geneva Lake to the south.

References

Lakes of Oakland County, Michigan
Lakes of Michigan
Lakes of Waterford Township, Michigan